Pump action or slide action is a repeating firearm  action that is operated manually by moving a sliding handguard on the gun's forestock.  When shooting, the sliding forend is pulled rearward to eject any expended cartridge and typically to cock the hammer/striker, and then pushed forward to load (chamber) a new cartridge into the chamber.  Most pump-action firearms use an integral tubular magazine, although some do use detachable box magazines. Pump-action is typically associated with shotguns, although it has been used in rifles and other firearms as well.

Because the forend is manipulated usually with the support hand, a pump-action gun is much faster than a bolt-action and somewhat faster than a lever-action, as it does not require the trigger hand to be removed from the trigger while reloading.  Also because the action is cycled in a linear fashion, it creates less torque that can tilt and throw the gun off aim when repeat-firing rapidly.

History
The first slide action patent was issued to Alexander Bain of Britain in 1854.

Many older pump-action shotguns can be fired faster than modern ones, as they often did not have a trigger disconnector, and were capable of firing a new round as fast as the pump action was cycled, with the trigger held down continuously. This technique is called a slamfire, and was often used in conjunction with the M1897 and M1912 shotguns in World War I trench warfare.

Modern pump-action designs are a little slower than a semi-automatic shotgun, but the pump-action offers greater flexibility in selection of shotshells, allowing the shooter to mix different types of loads and for using low-power or specialty loads. Semi-automatic shotguns must use some of the energy of each round fired to cycle their actions, meaning that they must be loaded with shells powerful enough to reliably cycle. The pump-action avoids this limitation. In addition, like all manual action guns, pump-action guns are inherently more reliable than semi-automatic guns under adverse conditions, such as exposure to dirt, sand, or climatic extremes. Thus, until recently, military combat shotguns were almost exclusively pump-action designs.

Disadvantages
Like most lever-action rifles, most pump-action shotguns and rifles use a fixed tubular magazine. This makes for slow reloading, as the cartridges have to be inserted individually into the firearm. However, some pump-action shotguns and rifles, including the Russian Zlatoust RB-12, Italian Valtro PM5, American Remington 7600 series, and the Mossberg 590M, use detachable box magazines.

Layout
A pump-action firearm is typically fed from a tubular magazine underneath the barrel, which also serves as a guide to the movable forend. The rounds are fed in one by one through a port in the receiver, where they are pushed forward. A latch at the rear of the magazine holds the rounds in place in the magazine until they are needed. If it is desired to load the gun fully, a round may be loaded through the ejection port directly into the chamber, or cycled from the magazine, which is then topped off with another round. Pump shotguns with detachable box magazines or even drums exist, and may or may not allow the magazine to be inserted without stripping the top round.

Operating cycle
Nearly all pump-actions use a back-and-forward motion of the forend to cycle the action. The forend is connected to the bolt by one or two bars; two bars are considered more reliable because it provides symmetric forces on the bolt and pump and reduces the chances of binding. The motion of the bolt back and forth in a tubular magazine model will also operate the elevator, which lifts the shells from the level of the magazine to the level of the barrel.

After firing a round, the bolt is unlocked and the forend is free to move. The shooter pulls back on the forend to begin the operating cycle. The bolt unlocks and begins to move to the rear, which extracts and ejects the empty shell from the chamber, cocks the hammer, and begins to load the new shell. In a tubular magazine design, as the bolt moves rearwards, a single shell is released from the magazine, and is pushed backwards to come to rest on the elevator.

As the forend reaches the rear and begins to move forward, the elevator lifts up the shell, lining it up with the barrel. As the bolt moves forward, the round slides into the chamber, and the final portion of the forend's travel locks the bolt into position. A pull of the trigger will fire the next round, where the cycle begins again.

Most pump-action firearms do not have any positive indication that they are out of ammunition, so it is possible to complete a cycle and have an empty chamber. The risk of running out of ammunition unexpectedly can be minimized in a tubular magazine firearm by topping off the magazine by loading new rounds to replace the rounds that have just been fired. This is especially important when hunting, as many locations have legal limits on the magazine capacity: for example, three rounds for shotguns and five rounds for rifles.

The BSA Machine Carbine used a unique pump-action that also required twisting the handguard.

Another variant was the Burgess Folding Shotgun from the late 19th century where instead of manipulating the forend to cycle the action, it had a sleeve around the grip area of the stock which the shooter would slide back and forward to cycle the gun. This was done because the forend based pump action was under patent at the time.

Shotguns

Pump-action shotguns, also called pump shotguns, slide-action repeating shotguns or slide-action shotguns are the most commonly seen pump-action firearms. These shotguns typically use a tubular magazine underneath the gun barrel to hold the shells, though there are some variants that use a box magazine like most rifles. It's not uncommon to see extra ammunition stored in externally mounted "shell holder" racks (usually as "sidesaddle" on one side of the receiver, or on the buttstock) for quick on-field reloading. The shells are chambered and extracted by pulling/pushing the sliding fore-end enveloping the tubular magazine toward the user.

In modern shotguns, the fore-end can be replaceable and often include picatinny rails or M-LOK for mounting accessories such as a tactical light, and the traditional straight grip might be replaced with a pistol grip for a more stable control.

Trigger disconnectors
Modern pump shotgun designs, such as the Remington 870 and Mossberg 500, have a safety feature called a trigger disconnector, which disconnects the trigger from the sear as the bolt moves back, so that the trigger must be released and pulled again to fire the shotgun after it closes. Many early pump shotguns, such as the Winchester 1897, did not have trigger disconnectors, and would, if the trigger were held back, fire immediately upon closing. Due to the higher rate of fire that this allows, some shooters prefer models without this feature, such as the Ithaca 37, Stevens Model 520/620, and Winchester Model 12.

Rifles

When used in rifles, this action is also commonly called a slide action or more commonly referred to in the 19th century as a trombone action.  Colt manufactured the Colt Lightning Carbine from 1884 to 1904 chambered in .44-40 caliber. The slide action Winchester Model 1890 chambered in .22 caliber was one of the most successful repeating rimfire rifle made by Winchester. Approximately 849,000 Model 1890 rifles were produced between 1890 and 1932. Later pump-action rifles were also manufactured by Winchester, Marlin, Browning and Remington.

A "reverse pump-action" design can sometimes be found, where the extraction is done by pushing the fore-end forwards, and re-chambered by pulling backwards. One such 21st-century variant is the Krieghoff Semprio "in-line repeating rifle". The Semprio is a reverse pump-action system that ejects cartridges when the fore-end is pushed forward and loads the chamber when pulled backward.

Airguns
The term pump-action can also be applied to various airsoft guns and air guns, which use a similar mechanism to both load a pellet and compress a spring piston for power, or pneumatic guns where a pump is used to compress the air used for power. See the airgun article for information on how spring piston and pneumatic airguns work.

Grenade launchers

The 43mm GM-94 is a pump-action grenade launcher developed by the KBP design bureau for use by Russian special forces. It carries three rounds in an above-the-barrel tubular magazine.

Another pump-action grenade launcher is the China Lake grenade launcher, which saw usage by the U.S. Navy SEALS in the Vietnam War in limited numbers.

See also 
 List of pump-action rifles

Other long gun actions 
 Single-shot
 Break-action
 Rolling block
 Falling block
 Repeating
 Revolving
 Bolt-action
 Lever-action
 Self-loading (semi-/fully automatic, select fire)
 Recoil operation
 Blowback
 Blow-forward
 Gas operation

References

Firearm actions
Pump-action shotguns